Under the Railways Act 1921 the majority of the railway companies in Great Britain (along with a few in Northern Ireland) were grouped into four main companies, often termed the Big Four. The grouping took effect from 1 January 1923.

The Big Four

The Big Four and their constituent companies, showing route mileage, were:
Great Western Railway (GWR)
 Great Western Railway 
 Alexandra (Newport and South Wales) Docks and Railway (ADR) 
 Barry Railway (Barry)  
 Cambrian Railways (Cambrian)  
 Cardiff Railway (Cardiff)  
 Rhymney Railway (RhyR)  
 Taff Vale Railway (TVR) 
 for the list of subsidiary companies and joint railways see List of constituents of the Great Western Railway
London and North Eastern Railway (LNER)
 Great Central Railway (GCR)  
 Great Eastern Railway (GER)  
 Great Northern Railway (GNR) 
 Hull and Barnsley Railway (H&BR) 
 North Eastern Railway (NER) 
 Great North of Scotland Railway (GNSR)  
 North British Railway (NBR) 
 for the list of subsidiary companies and joint railways see List of constituents of the London and North Eastern Railway 
London, Midland and Scottish Railway (LMS)
 London and North Western Railway (LNWR); 
 including Lancashire and Yorkshire Railway (L&YR) amalgamated from 1 January 1922
 Furness Railway (Furness); 
 Midland Railway (MR) 
 North Staffordshire Railway (NSR) 
 Caledonian Railway (CR) 
 Glasgow and South Western Railway (GSWR) 
 Highland Railway (HR) 
 for the list of subsidiary companies and joint railways see List of constituents of the London, Midland and Scottish Railway
The Railways Act 1921 did not extend to Ireland, but Irish lines owned by constituent companies became part of the LMS:
 Dundalk, Newry and Greenore Railway (DNGR)  (owned by the LNWR)
 Northern Counties Committee lines (NCC)  (owned by the Midland Railway)
 The NCC and Great Northern Railway (Ireland) (GNR(I)) operated the County Donegal Railways Joint Committee lines jointly, and these became joint lines of the LMS and GNR(I) after grouping.
Southern Railway (SR)
 London, Brighton and South Coast Railway (LBSCR)  
 London and South Western Railway (LSWR) 
 South Eastern and Chatham Railways' Managing Committee: a working union of the South Eastern Railway and the London, Chatham and Dover Railway 
 for the list of subsidiary companies and joint railways see List of constituent companies of the Southern Railway

Companies not covered by the grouping

Over fifty railway companies were not covered by the grouping. Those in the following list were those organised on an independent basis, usually providing locomotives and rolling stock also. They are included under classification headings.

Joint railways
Joint lines in this respect were wholly owned by two or more other companies. If not all of the owning companies went into the same group then the joint company could not be grouped. Joint lines did not always operate any services: they owned the track, stations etc. and the services were operated by one or more of the parent companies:

These are those in which the group companies only are concerned:
 Cheshire Lines Committee: (GNR, Midland and GCR); now operated under direction of a board of directors appointed by LNER (two-thirds) and LMS (one-third). Length . Rolling stock owned by CLC; locomotive power by LNER.
 Great Western and Great Central Joint Railway: GWR and GCR; subsequent to the grouping the parent companies were the GWR and the LNER, but the title was not altered.
 Manchester, South Junction and Altrincham Railway: LNWR and GCR; subsequent to the grouping the parent companies were the LMS and the LNER.
 Midland and Great Northern Joint Railway: (Midland and GNR; subsequent to the grouping the parent companies were the LMS and the LNER). Length . This was the largest joint system in the UK, and many of the services were operated by the joint company itself. In addition, it received substantial traffic from the GNR and MR/LMS, but rather less post-grouping from the LNER (which also owned the competing ex-GER system in East Anglia).
 Somerset and Dorset Joint Railway: (Midland and LSWR). Length .
Joint lines where one or more partners were ungrouped:
 Aylesbury Station: joint between the GW & GC Joint and the Metropolitan and Great Central Joint Committee
 East London Railway: prior to grouping, this railway was owned one-sixth each by the Great Eastern Railway, London, Brighton and South Coast Railway, Metropolitan Railway, District Railway; and one-third by the South Eastern and Chatham Railway (as successors to the London, Chatham and Dover Railway and South Eastern Railway, who had owned one-sixth each). After grouping, it was owned half by the Southern, and one-sixth each by the LNER, Metropolitan and District. Length . Managed and operated by Met; goods traffic by LNER. 
 Metropolitan and Great Central Joint Committee: prior to grouping, owned by the Metropolitan Railway and GCR; post-Grouping, Metropolitan and LNER.

Railways not included in group companies

Electric or electric and steam lines
 Railways associated with the Underground Electric Railways Company of London:
 Central London Railway: . Trains worked through to Ealing over the Ealing and Shepherd's Bush Railway (GWR)
 City and South London Railway: 
 London Electric Railway: : amalgamation of the Baker Street and Waterloo Railway, Great Northern, Piccadilly and Brompton Railway and Charing Cross, Euston and Hampstead Railway
 District Railway: 
 Other electric/steam railways:
 Liverpool Overhead Railway: 
 Mersey Railway: 
 Metropolitan Railway: steam and electric  including the Great Northern and City Railway

Light and similar railways (standard gauge)
 Bideford, Westward Ho! and Appledore Railway:  closed at time of grouping 
 Bishops Castle Railway: 
 Corringham Light Railway: 
 Derwent Valley Light Railway: 
 Easingwold Railway: 
 East Kent Railway: 
 Glasgow (Cable) Subway: 
 Hellingly Hospital Railway: 
 Hundred of Manhood and Selsey Tramways:  *
 Kent & East Sussex Railway:  *
 Mumbles Railway: 
 Nidd Valley Light Railway:  public;  private
 North Sunderland Railway: 
 Rowrah and Kelton Fell Railway: 
 Shropshire and Montgomeryshire Railway  *
 Stocksbridge Railway: 
 Swansea Improvements and Tramways Company: 
 Wantage Tramway: 
 Weston, Clevedon and Portishead Railway:

Light and similar railways (narrow gauge)
 Ashover Light Railway: ; 
 Brighton Electric Railway: ; 
 Camborne and Redruth Tramway: ; 
 Campbeltown and Machrihanish Railway: ; 
 Corris Railway: ; 
 Ravenglass and Eskdale Railway: ; 
 Ffestiniog Railway: ; 
 Glyn Valley Railway: ; 
 North Wales Narrow Gauge Railways: ; 
 Portmadoc, Beddgelert and South Snowdon Railway: ; 
 Rye and Camber Tramway: ; 
 Snailbeach District Railways: ; 
 Snowdon Mountain Tramroad: ; ; rack railway
 Southwold Railway: ; 
 Talyllyn Railway: ; 
 Wolverton and Stony Stratford Tramway: ; owned by LMSR

Railways outside the jurisdiction of the Railways Act 1921
The Railways Act 1921 only extended to Great Britain. Railways in Ireland and the Crown Dependencies were not affected unless owned by a railway company in Great Britain. The railways included in this section were standard gauge, unless otherwise noted:
 Alderney Railway
 Belfast and County Down Railway; 
 Cork, Bandon and South Coast Railway; ; 
 Dublin and South Eastern Railway; ; 
 Great Northern Railway (Ireland); ;
 Great Southern and Western Railway; ; 
 Guernsey Railway; 
 Isle of Man Railway; ; 
 Jersey Eastern Railway; 
 Jersey Railway and Tramways; ; 
 Londonderry and Lough Swilly Railway; 
 Sligo, Leitrim and Northern Counties Railway; 
 Midland Great Western Railway; ;

Miscellaneous railways
The railways included in this section were standard gauge, unless otherwise noted:
 Felixstowe Docks and Railway: 
 Manchester Ship Canal: 
 Mersey Docks and Harbour Board: 
 Milford Haven Dock and Railway: 
 Pentewan Railway: ; ; temporarily closed 1923
 Trafford Park:

See also
History of rail transport in Great Britain
Rail transport in Great Britain

Big four British railway companies
Pre-grouping British railway companies
Railway companies involved in the 1923 grouping